Agios Iakovos ( 'Saint James';  'golden plain', previously ) is a village in Cyprus, located  northwest of Trikomo. It is under the de facto control of Northern Cyprus. As of 2011, Agios Iakovos had a population of 229. It has always been inhabited by Turkish Cypriots.

References

Communities in Famagusta District
Populated places in İskele District